The West Coburg Football Club is an Australian rules football club located 8 km north west of Melbourne in the suburb of Coburg. The club fields seniors and juniors in the Essendon District Football League.

History 
The club is one of the oldest in the EDFL, founded in 1927, it soon found itself playing in the VFA Sub-District Association. It took a little time to settle then the club won five premierships in a row from 1937 to 1941. After the war the club again saluted in 1949 and 1953.

EDFL 
In 1954 West Coburg transferred to the Essendon District Football League. The VFA Sub Districts had wounded up and the club needed a new competition. Coming from a strong standard competition the club was competitive by falling short in its debut season and gain in 1957.

West Coburg's first A Grade premiership was in 1965, defeating Aberfeldie, 5.6.36 to 4.7.31 in a low-scoring affair.

The club won four premierships across two Grades between 1965 and 1968.

Senior Premierships  
 VFA Sub-districts
 1937, 1938, 1939, 1940, 1941, 1949, 1953.
 Essendon District Football League A Grade (Premier Division)
 1965, 1967, 1968, 1970, 1971.
Essendon District Football League B Grade (Division 1)
 1958, 1963, 1966, 1987, 1991, 1996, 2000, 2006, 2014.
 Essendon District Football League C Grade
 1977

VFL/AFL players 
 David Dench -  
 Daryl O'Brien - 
 Wes Lofts - 
 Andrew Ukovic - , 
 John May - 
 Phil Carlton - 
 Brandon Ellis - 

Books 
 History of football in Melbourne's north west – John Stoward -  

Essendon District Football League clubs
1927 establishments in Australia
Australian rules football clubs established in 1927
Australian rules football clubs in Melbourne
Sport in the City of Merri-bek